Magomed Mustafaev (born August 2, 1988, in Dagestan) is a Russian mixed martial artist, who competed in the Lightweight division of the UFC. A professional competitor since 2011, he has also competed for M-1 Global.

Background
Magomed Mustafaev was born on February 8, 1988, in the village of Aimaki in modern-day Dagestan. He began training in freestyle wrestling while in elementary school. After high school, he moved to Sochi and started training MMA. He is the winner of the Pankration Black Sea Cup.

Mixed martial arts career

Early career
Mustafaev made his professional mixed martial arts debut on April 29, 2011, defeating fellow Russian Marat Medzhidov by TKO in the first round.  The first loss on his professional record came in his next fight less than three months later against Dagestani Arsen Ubaidulaev due to a rear-naked choke.

Mustafaev faced to Russian MMA prospect Andrei Koshkin on March 14, 2014, at M-1 Challenge 46. He won via submission in the second round.

On September 1, 2014, Mustafaev competed in the Sochi Star 2014 Welterweight Grand Prix. Mustafaev defeated Amirkhan Adaev and Gleb Morozov both by KO in the first round. Mustafaev followed up with another winning performance against Russian MMA prospect and WSOF fighter Abubakar Nurmagomedov (cousin of Khabib Nurmagomedov) to claim the tournament victory and propel himself into consideration for a shot in a top tier MMA promotion.

Ultimate Fighting Championship

Following the tournament victory and a 10 fight win streak in various Russian MMA events, Mustafaev signed with the Ultimate Fighting Championship on November 6, 2014. In his move from Russian MMA promotions to the UFC, Mustafaev transitioned from Welterweight to the Lightweight division.

Mustafaev first fought in the UFC opposite Piotr Hallmann on June 20, 2015, at UFC Fight Night 69 in Berlin, Germany. Mustafaev won by TKO (doctor's stoppage) in the second round due to multiple cuts around the eyes of Hallmann.

Mustafaev faced Joe Proctor at UFC 194 on December 12, 2015. He won the fight via TKO in the first round after a liver kick.

Mustafaev faced Kevin Lee at UFC Fight Night 99 on November 19, 2016. He suffered an arm injury and lost the fight by submission due to a rear naked choke in the second round.

After an extended hiatus, due in part to an arm injury suffered in his last fight, Musafaev faced promotional newcomer Rafael Fiziev on April 20, 2019, at UFC Fight Night 149. Mustafaev won the fight by first round technical knockout. This win earned him the Performance of the Night award.

Mustafaev was expected to face Don Madge on September 7, 2019, at UFC 242. However, on August 18, 2019, it was reported that Mustafaev was removed from the bout for undisclosed reasons.

Mustafaev faced Brad Riddell on February 23, 2020, at UFC Fight Night: Felder vs. Hooker. He lost the fight via split decision.

Mustafaev was scheduled to face Renato Moicano on October 18, 2020 at UFC Fight Night 180. However, Moicano pulled out of the fight in mid-September for undisclosed reasons, and he was replaced by Mateusz Gamrot. In turn, the bout was scrapped entirely for undisclosed reasons.

Mustafaev was expected to face Damir Ismagulov on October 30, 2021, at UFC 267. However at the weigh-ins, Ismagulov came in at 163.5 pounds, missing weight by 7.5 pounds, the bout was subsequently canceled by the UFC.

Mustafaev was scheduled to face Jamie Mullarkey on October 22, 2022, at UFC 280. However, Mullarkey pulled out in mid-September due to injury, and he was replaced by Yamato Nishikawa. In turn, Nishikawa was forced to withdraw due to contractual issues. The bout was ultimately scrapped from the card.

In late October 2022, it was reported that Mustafaev was released by the UFC.

Championships and accomplishments

Mixed martial artist
Ultimate Fighting Championship
 Performance of the Night (One time)

Mixed martial arts record

|-
|Loss
|align=center|14–3
|Brad Riddell
|Decision (split)
|UFC Fight Night: Felder vs. Hooker
|
|align=center|3
|align=center|5:00
|Auckland, New Zealand
|
|-
|Win
|align=center|14–2
|Rafael Fiziev
|TKO (spinning back kick and punches)
|UFC Fight Night: Overeem vs. Oleinik
|
|align=center|1
|align=center|1:26
|Saint Petersburg, Russia
|
|-
|Loss
|align=center|13–2
|Kevin Lee
|Technical Submission (rear-naked choke)
|UFC Fight Night: Mousasi vs. Hall 2
|
|align=center|2 
|align=center|4:31
|Belfast, Northern Ireland
|
|-
|Win
|align=center|13–1
|Joe Proctor
|TKO (knees and punches)
|UFC 194
|
|align=center|1
|align=center|1:54
|Las Vegas, Nevada, United States
|
|-
|Win
|align=center|12–1
|Piotr Hallmann
|TKO (doctor stoppage)
|UFC Fight Night: Jędrzejczyk vs. Penne
|
|align=center|2
|align=center|3:24
|Berlin, Germany
|
|-
| Win
| align=center| 11–1
| Abubakar Nurmagomedov
| TKO (doctor stoppage)
|rowspan=2| Sochi Star Club: Sochi Star Tournament 1
|rowspan=2|
| align=center| 1
| align=center| 4:11
|rowspan=2| Sochi, Russia
|
|-
| Win
| align=center| 10–1
| Amirkhan Adaev
| KO (slam)
| align=center| 1
| align=center| 1:38
|
|-
| Win
| align=center| 9–1
| Andrei Koshkin
| Verbal Submission (heel hook)
| M-1 Challenge 46
| 
| align=center| 2
| align=center| 0:39
| Saint Petersburg, Russia
|
|-
| Win
| align=center| 8–1
| Lom-Ali Nalgiev
| Submission (rear-naked choke)
| Legion Fight 18
| 
| align=center| 2
| align=center| 2:45
| Sochi, Russia
|
|-
| Win
| align=center| 7–1
| Guseyn Omarov
| TKO (doctor stoppage)
| Legion Fight 17
| 
| align=center| 2
| align=center| 1:39
| Vladikavkaz, Russia
|
|-
| Win
| align=center| 6–1
| Islam Begidov
| KO (punches)
|rowspan=2| Legion Fight 15
|rowspan=2| 
| align=center| 1
| align=center| 1:55
|rowspan=2| Sochi, Russia
|
|-
| Win
| align=center| 5–1
| Artyom Egorov
| Submission (armbar)
| align=center| 1
| align=center| 1:55
|
|-
| Win
| align=center| 4–1
| Vadim Ogar
| Submission (triangle choke)
|rowspan=2| Legion Fight 12
|rowspan=2| 
| align=center| 1
| align=center| 1:15
|rowspan=2| Sochi, Russia
|
|-
| Win
| align=center| 3–1
| Dmitry Korobeynikov
| TKO (punches)
| align=center| 1
| align=center| 2:40
|
|-
| Win
| align=center| 2–1
| Sakhil Askarov
| TKO (corner stoppage)
| Legion Fight 10
| 
| align=center| 2
| align=center| 2:20
| Sochi, Russia
|
|-
| Loss
| align=center| 1–1
| Arsen Ubaidulaev
| Submission (rear-naked choke)
| Legion Fight 9
| 
| align=center| 2
| align=center| 3:20
| Sochi, Russia
|
|-
| Win
| align=center| 1–0
| Marat Medzhidov
| TKO (punches)
| Legion Fight 7
| 
| align=center| 1
| align=center| 4:55
| Sochi, Russia
|

See also
 List of male mixed martial artists

References

External links
 
 

1988 births
Living people
Lightweight mixed martial artists
Mixed martial artists utilizing freestyle wrestling
Mixed martial artists utilizing pankration
Russian male mixed martial artists
People from Dagestan
Avar people
Ultimate Fighting Championship male fighters
Sportspeople from Dagestan